The Leader of the Green Party of England and Wales is the most senior political figure within the Green Party of England and Wales. The role was introduced alongside that of deputy leader in 2008. Prior to this, the party's public spokespersons were principal speakers. There were two principal speakers, one female and one male, who were elected annually at the Green Party's Autumn Conference and held no vote on the Green Party Executive (GPEx).

A referendum passed on 30 November 2007 that abolished the posts of principal speakers and a leader and deputy were elected at the party's next autumn conference on 5 September 2008.

Role and history
The principal speakers performed the public and media roles undertaken by the leaders of more conventional political parties. Green parties often consider joint leadership of this kind to embody the widely held Green beliefs in consensus decision making and gender balance. It also symbolises their belief in the need for a society in which people are empowered and involved in making the decisions which affect them. In the party's Philosophical Basis, it states that the Green Party "reject[s] the hierarchical structure of leaders and followers, and, instead advocate[s] participatory politics" and it is "for this reason" that the Green Party has eschewed an individual leader.

There were six principal speakers in the UK Green Party until 1991, when changes introduced by the Green 2000 grouping reduced this to two and streamlined the organisation of the party. This left a system with which neither side in the 2007 leadership referendum was happy.

2007 Leadership referendum
At the party's 2007 spring conference in Swansea, members voted to hold a cross-party referendum on whether the posts should be changed to leader and deputy leader (with the option for co-leaders if two candidates chose to run together and were gender balanced, in the event of which there would be no deputy leader). The new system would allow the leader and deputy (or co-leaders) to vote on GPEx and, rather than being elected annually (like the principal speakers), the posts would be elected every two years. Provisions for recalling the leader and deputy were articulated. Despite the controversial nature of this issue, many participants, such as Siân Berry, were struck by the how "constructive" the debate turned out to be.

On Friday 30 November 2007 the ballots were counted and members voted 73% to 27% in favour of the new leadership model, with a 48.3% turnout of Green Party members.

The 'Pro-Leader' side – Green Yes
Supporters of the 'Green Yes' campaign for a yes vote in the referendum included the then-principal speaker Caroline Lucas MEP, Siân Berry, Darren Johnson AM (a Green member of the London Assembly), environmental commentator and Green member Mark Lynas, former principal speaker Jonathon Porritt, councillors from Lewisham, Brighton, Norwich, Leicester and Lancaster, and members of the Green Party Executive (GPEx), including Jim Killock (external communications officer), elections coordinator Peter Cranie and Khalid Hussenbux, the party's financial coordinator.

The Green Yes campaign believed that the Green Party needed a leader to reach its potential and that, if the party did not reach its potential, it would be "selling-short our planet and everything on it". They suggested that the party's success has been too slow and that "a leader would help set direction, political focus and make sure the party gets the resources to grow". The campaign hoped that having a Leader would be "about empowering the party" and "about accountability", in that a Leader would "mean we can identify who to hold to account when things need changing". The group added that other Green Parties in the world had leaders and remained "just as Green as the rest of us".

Mark Lynas, in several editions of his New Statesman blog, further claimed that the name 'Principal Speaker' was not transparent to the public, that it wasted valuable time in explaining the system to the media and that it lacked credibility. Darren Johnson characterized the lack of single leader as "just a ridiculous barrier in terms of getting our really important message across".

The 'Anti-Leader' side – Green Empowerment
Supporters of the 'Green Empowerment' campaign for a no vote in the leadership referendum included the then-Principal Speaker Derek Wall, Jenny Jones AM (a Green member of the London Assembly), the late Timothy Beaumont (Green member of the House of Lords), prominent human rights campaigner and Green member Peter Tatchell, Noel Lynch (London Green Party Coordinator and former London Assembly member), councillors from Scarborough, Lewisham, York, Norwich and Hackney, and members of the Green Party Executive (GPEx), including Campaigns Coordinator, Tim Summers, and Pete McAskie (Management Coordinator). Some members, like Matt Sellwood, while in favour of a Leader system in principle, were opposed to the current referendum because the term of reelection would be extended to two years.

Supporters of Green Empowerment wanted to "uphold the Green Party's long-standing commitment to non-hierarchical structures and 'grassroots' democracy" through "collective leadership". They believed that a single leader "would not only draw attention away from other speakers and the wider Party, but would bring with it risks that the other parties in this country are all too well aware of". The campaign focused on retaining gender balance in party structures, and avoiding the dilution of their radical policies. They focused on success under the Principal Speaker system, seen in the steady buildup of support from the low point of the 1992 general election to the situation at the time of the referendum, where the party has over 100 councilors along with two members of the European Parliament and two members of the London Assembly.

Derek Wall countered pro-leader arguments by stating that "if you are a clear speaker, there's no problem getting coverage and explaining the party's views." He was concerned by the history of past political parties that started off as being participatory until they adopted a single leader system in which the members became "puppets". Wall also opposed the reduction in numbers of Principal Speakers from six to two in 1992, as advocated by the Green 2000 group.

Party Leader era
In September 2008 Caroline Lucas was elected as the party's first leader. Lucas was reelected in 2010 but chose not to stand in 2012, when Natalie Bennett was elected her successor. After Bennett stood down in 2016 Lucas returned as leader, this time sharing the position with Jonathan Bartley.

In 2018, Siân Berry replaced Lucas as co-leader, with Bartley continuing in the role.

In July 2021 Jonathan Bartley announced he would be standing down as the party's co-leader at the end of the month, triggering the 2021 Green Party of England and Wales leadership election. Siân Berry remained as acting leader, but decided not to stand in the leadership election due to her concerns over the party's message on trans rights.  In her statement, Berry cited unspecified spokesperson appointments as being inconsistent with her pledge to support trans equality.

Leaders

Principal Speakers (1990–1992)
Prior to 1992 six principal speakers were elected annually.
Sara Parkin
Jim Berreen
Andrew Simms
Jean Lambert
David Spaven
Derek Wall

Principal Speakers (1992–2008)

Party leadership (2008–present)

Timeline

Election results

2021

2018

2007

2006
The Female Principal Speaker post was won by Siân Berry, without a contest.

2004
The Female Principal Speaker post was won by Caroline Lucas, without a contest.

Chairs
1990: Mallen Baker, John Laker and Judy Maciejowska 
1991: John Laker, John Norris and Sara Parkin
1992: Sara Parkin
1993: John Norris
1994: Jean Lambert
1995: John Morrissey
1996: Jenny Jones
1998: Alan Francis
2000: Penny Kemp
2003: Hugo Charlton
2006: Richard Mallender
2008: James Humphreys
2009: Jayne Forbes
2011: Jo Steranka
2012: Tim Dawes
2014: Richard Mallender
2016: Clare Phipps
2018: Liz Reason

Regional variations
The leader of the Wales Green Party is Anthony Slaughter, who was elected as the party's leader in December 2018. Some regional and local groups have adopted a gender balance principle and emulated the Principal Speaker structure, including the LSE Students' Union Green Party, who have a Female and Male Co-Chair.

References

External links
Derek Wall on why the GP needs to keep the Principal Speaker system
Darren Johnson AM on BBC site explains why the Green party needs a Leader 
 Siân Berry describes the debate and her preference for Co-leaders
 Green Yes Website
 Green Empowerment Website
  Caroline Lucas: The greens need a clear voice – and a leader
  Jenny Jones: A political party with a leader? – How 20th century

History of the Green Party of England and Wales
 
Green Party of England and Wales